Ýusup Orazmämmedov is a professional Turkmen football player. He currently plays for FC Merw from Mary.

International Career Statistics

Goals for Senior National Team

External links

Turkmenistan footballers
Turkmenistan international footballers
Living people
1986 births
Association football forwards